Motherscratcher is the fourth studio album by Texas noise rock band Ed Hall, released in 1993 by Trance Syndicate.

Critical reception
The Washington Post wrote: "Arty primitives, the members of Ed Hall (none of them named Ed or Hall) delight in childish scenarios (like that of 'White House Girls'), simplistic rhythms and noisy guitars."

Track listing

Personnel
Adapted from the Motherscratcher liner notes.

Ed Hall
 Gary Chester – electric guitar, vocals, cover art
 Lyman Hardy – drums
 Larry Strub – bass guitar, vocals

Production and additional personnel
 Marty Harris – photography
 Adam Wiltzie – production, mixing

Release history

References

External links 
 

1993 albums
Ed Hall (band) albums
Albums produced by Adam Wiltzie
Trance Syndicate albums